Charng Ratanarat (1904–1993) was a Thai chemist, government official and entrepreneur. He was the first to develop iron smelting techniques in Thailand, for the Siam Cement Company, where he served on the board of directors. He served as the Director-general of the Department of Science under the Ministry of Industry from 1944 to 1963, and as Permanent Secretary of Industry after that. He made multiple business ventures, the most significant of which is the Siam Chemicals Company, which grew from a capital of 12 million baht in 1959 to be worth over one billion by the 1990s.

References

Charng Ratanarat
Charng Ratanarat
Charng Ratanarat
Charng Ratanarat
1904 births
1993 deaths